The Bangladesh national cricket team played a 4-match ODI series in Zimbabwe from 4 to 10 February 2007.

Squads

ODI series

1st ODI

2nd ODI

3rd ODI

4th ODI

References

Sources
 Playfair Cricket Annual
 Wisden Cricketers Almanack

2007 in Bangladeshi cricket
2007 in Zimbabwean cricket
2006-07
International cricket competitions in 2006–07
Zimbabwean cricket seasons from 2000–01